The 1970 Purdue Boilermakers football team represented Purdue University in the 1970 Big Ten Conference football season. Led by first-year head coach Bob DeMoss, the Boilermakers compiled an overall record of 4–6 with a mark of 2–5 in conference play, placing eighth in the Big Ten. This was Purdue's first losing season since the 1956 season. The team played home games at Ross–Ade Stadium in West Lafayette, Indiana.

Schedule

Personnel

Game summaries

TCU
 Otis Armstrong,  22 rushes, 100 yards

Stanford

    
    
    
    
    
    
    

Purdue intercepted Stanford quarterback Jim Plunkett five times.

 Otis Armstrong 27 rushes, 120 yards

Iowa
 Otis Armstrong 25 rushes, 164 yards

Ohio State

Indiana
 Otis Armstrong 23 rushes, 168 yards

References

Purdue
Purdue Boilermakers football seasons
Purdue Boilermakers football